The Dreamhold is an interactive fiction game by Andrew Plotkin released in 2004. Its primary purpose is to be a tutorial to interactive fiction, and because of that the "core" of the game is relatively easy to finish.

As an attempt to make it more appealing for seasoned IF players, Plotkin added an "expert mode", which can be activated early in the game and makes certain puzzles harder.

It won the 2004 XYZZY Awards for Best Puzzles and Best Use of Medium.

On June 24, 2014, the author released the source code for educational purposes.

References

External links
 The Dreamhold on Plotkin's official website
 Baf's Guide entry for The Dreamhold
 I Had a Dream Which Was Not All a Dream — a review by Dan Shiovitz
 Magic Memories — a review by Magnus Ollson
 Review of The Dreamhold at SPAG

2000s interactive fiction
2004 video games
Video games developed in the United States
Video games with alternate endings